Oxycopis mcdonaldi is a species of false blister beetle in the family Oedemeridae. It is found in the Caribbean and North America.

References

Further reading

External links

 

Oedemeridae
Beetles of North America
Insects of the Caribbean
Beetles described in 1951
Articles created by Qbugbot